World Federation of Associations of Pediatric Surgeons (WOFAPS) is an organisation established on 15 October 1974 in Brazil to promote the ethical study of pediatric research and to promote Pediatric Surgery as a distinct specialty of general surgery. The Kyoto Declaration of Pediatric Surgery, written in 2001, established the mission of the Federation to focus on the development and education of surgeons serving children, in all parts of the world.

History
Several surgeons and associations supported the endorsement of the proposal for the "International Union of Pediatric Surgeons" proposed by Denys Pellerin in Paris in 1963. But the progress was slow. On 15 October 1974, WOFAPS was founded in Sao Paulo, Brazil, during a Pediatric Surgery Congress with representatives from 43 Countries under the Presidency of Prof. Virgilio Carvalho Pinto and Secretary General Prof. Jose Pinus. Harvey Beardmore from Canada was elected the first President of the WOFAPS. while Prof Jose "Pepe" Boix Ochoa was again re-elected as General Secretary (a post he would hold for 35 years!!).

Until 1983, only 23 associations belonged to the WOFAPS, but the organization has grown to include over 100 member countries today. It is recognized and participates in International Associations of Pediatric Surgery as a member as well as the International Pediatric Association, as well as other organizations such as UNICEF, UNESCO and WHO. This has been due to the past leadership and efforts of the members.

The WOFAPS is a representation of Pediatric Surgical Associations and it does not represent any political ideas nor does it make any racial or religious distinction. The WOFAPS is governed by its Constitution and its official office is in Bern, Switzerland.

The WOFAPS Foundation is a subsidiary of WOFAPS that offers Scholarships to International Young Pediatric Surgeons from developing countries who have demonstrated strong interests in teaching and research. The WOFAPS foundation is headed by Prof. Prem Puri, previous president of WOFAPS and Lifetime Achievement Award recipient in 2013.

WOFAPS presidents
 Harvey E. Beardmore (Canada) 1975–1977
 Denys Pellerin France) 1978–1980
 R.K. Gandhi (India) 1981–1983
 M. Bettex (Switzerland) 1984–1986
 Jose Ricardo Piñeiro (Argentina) 1987–1989
 K. Ashcraft (U.S.A.) 1990–1992
 W.A. Maier (Germany) 1993–1995
 Sid Cywes (South Africa) 1996–1998
 Jay Lazar Grosfeld (USA) 1999–2001
 T. Miyano (Japan) 2002–2004
 Arnold G. Coran (USA) 2005–2007
 Prem Puri (Ireland) 2008–2010
 Richard Azizkhan (USA) 2011–2013
 Devendra Gupta (India) 2014–2016
 David Sigalet (Canada) 2016–2019
 Sameh Shehata (Egypt) 2019–2022
 Alp Numanoglu (South Africa) 2022-2025

The board is currently led by Alp Numanoglu acting as president, Shilpa Sharma as general secretary and Udo Rolle is the president elect for the current term (2022-2025).

WOFAPS meetings
2025: Izmir, Turkey 
2022: Prague, Czech Republic
2019: Doha, Qatar
2016: Washington, D.C., USA
2013: Berlin, Germany
2010: Delhi, India
2007: Buenos Aires, Argentina
2004: Zagreb, Croatia

References

External links
 

Surgical_organizations
Medical associations based in Switzerland
Medical associations
Organizations established in 1974
Pediatric surgery
Pediatric organizations